Emmett Hill Meadows is a 5.1 hectare biological Site of Special Scientific Interest in Wiltshire, notified in 1987.

The site is managed as a nature reserve by Wiltshire Wildlife Trust.

Sources

 Natural England citation sheet for the site (accessed 24 March 2022)

External links
 Emmett Hill Meadows - Wiltshire Wildlife Trust
 Natural England website (SSSI information)

Sites of Special Scientific Interest in Wiltshire
Sites of Special Scientific Interest notified in 1987
Wiltshire Wildlife Trust reserves
Meadows in Wiltshire